Fangjiashan Nuclear Power Plant (方家山核电站) is a nuclear power plant in the Zhejiang province, China, bordering the Shanghai municipality. The plant consists of two 1,080 MW CPR-1000 pressurized water reactors (PWR) at a total cost of estimated 26 billion yuan (US$ 3.8 billion).

'First concrete' for the first unit at the Fangjiashan plant was poured on 26 December 2008, construction of the second unit followed in July 2009. Construction was done by China Nuclear Power Engineering (CNPE), while the reactor pressure vessels were manufactured by China First Heavy Industries and the turbosets by Dongfang Electric. The reactors were put in commercial operation in December 2014 and February 2015, respectively.

The existing Qinshan Nuclear Power Plant with 7 reactors is nearby: essentially Fangjiashan NPP is an extension of the Qinshan NPP, forming an aggregated complex. The Fangjiashan NPP is mainly owned by CNNC (72%), with minority stakes by Zhejiang Provincial Energy Group Co Ltd.

Two units of CNNC's CNP-1000 were due to be installed at Fangjiashan Nuclear Power Plant. However, the design was subsequently changed to CGN's CPR-1000.

Reactor data
The Fangjiashan Nuclear Power Plant consists of 2 operational reactors.

See also

Nuclear power in China

References

External links 

Nuclear power stations in China
Power stations in Zhejiang
Nuclear power stations using CPR-1000 reactors
2013 establishments in China
Jiaxing
Nuclear power stations with reactors under construction